Events from the year 1901 in Italy.

Kingdom of Italy
Monarch – Victor Emmanuel III (1900–1946)
Prime Minister –
 Giuseppe Saracco (1900–1901)
 Giuseppe Zanardelli (1901–1903)
Population – 32,550,000

Events
The year was characterized by a strike wave that brought down the government of Prime Minister Giuseppe Saracco in February. There were over 1,671 strikes involving 420,000 workers compared to 410 strikes and 43,000 workers in 1900. There were many agricultural labour strikes in Emila and Lombardy.

January
 January 18 – Pope Leo XIII issues the  encyclical Graves de communi re on Christian Democracy.
 January 27 – Italian opera composer Giuseppe Verdi, who symbolized the country's unification movement, dies at the age of 87. While staying at the Grand Hotel in Milan, Verdi suffered a stroke. He was initially buried in a private ceremony at Milan's Cimitero Monumentale. A month later, his body was moved to the crypt of the Casa di Riposo per Musicisti. On this occasion, "Va, pensiero" from Nabucco was conducted by Arturo Toscanini with a chorus of 820 singers. A huge crowd was in attendance, estimated at 300,000.

February
 February 6 – The Government headed by Giuseppe Saracco is defeated in the Chamber of Deputies by a vote of 318 to 102 on the dissolution of the Camera del Lavoro (Labour Exchange) at Genoa. The Labour Exchange had been closed during a strike in the port of Genoa, when dock workers refused to unload cargo shifted from the neighbouring French port of Marseilles where another strike was going on.
 February 8 – Prime Minister Saracco resigns by a vote of the chamber condemning his weak attitude towards the general dock strike at Genoa. 
 February 15 – Giuseppe Zanardelli forms a new government with Giovanni Giolitti as Interior minister. Giolitti will dominate Italian politics until World War I, a period known as the Giolittian Era in which Italy experienced an industrial expansion, the rise of organised labour and the emergence of an active Catholic political movement.

June
 June 21 – Interior Minister Giovanni Giolitti delivers a statement in the Chamber of Deputies about the agricultural crisis. As a result of government mediation 511 strikes involving 600,000 workers had been settled by mutual concessions.

August
 August 11 – Former Prime Minister Francesco Crispi dies in Naples at 7:45 PM after an illness of several weeks.

September 
 September 3 – A new emigration law is passed. Only from the ports of Naples, Genoa and Palermo, emigration is permitted. A General Commission for Emigration is set up to provide advice to emigrants and supervise the conditions on the ships, to counter the exploitation of shipping agents.
 September 7 – Italy is granted a concession in Tientsin from the Chinese government after the Boxer Rebellion.

October
 October 22 – The Royal Commission of Inquiry into Naples, presided by senator Giuseppe Saredo, that investigated corruption and bad governance in the city of Naples presents its report. The inquiry unearthed a serious situation of corruption, clientelism and general inefficiency and an extensive political patronage system, the so-called "administrative Camorra" or "high Camorra"; the corrupt class of Neapolitan executive in charge of city governments between the 1880s and 1890s. The commission was established in November 1900. The Saredo Commission's report discredited the Liberal politicians of Naples, who were voted from office in the local elections of November 1901.
 October 30 – The 5.5  Salò earthquake shakes northern Italy with a maximum Mercalli intensity of VII–VIII (Very strong–Severe) causing some buildings to collapse.

November
 November 30 – Finance Minister Paolo Carcano announces a surplus of 41,000,000 lire (US$7,800,000) for the past financial year and anticipated a surplus of 13,000,000 lire for 1901–02. Italy is the only great power in Europe in a good financial position.

December
 December 13 – Prime Minister Zanardelli delivers a statement in the Chamber of Deputies, in which he showed how the efforts of the Government had improved the health and material prosperity of Naples and the southern provinces, announced that he hoped to conclude commercial treaties with Germany and Austria benefiting Italian agriculture. He also announced the establishment of two railroad lines between Rome and Naples.

Births
 July 7 – Vittorio De Sica, Italian film director and leading figure in the Italian neorealism movement (d. 1974)
 August 10 – Franco Dino Rasetti, Italian scientist, who discovered key processes leading to nuclear fission with Enrico Fermi (d. 2001)
 August 29 – Oscar D'Agostino, Italian chemist and one of the Via Panisperna boys, the group of young scientists led by Enrico Fermi (d. 1975)
 August 20 – Salvatore Quasimodo, Italian writer and Nobel Prize laureate (d. 1968)
 September 5 – Mario Scelba, Italian politician and Prime Minister (d. 1991) 
 September 15 – Luigi Fantappiè, Italian mathematician (d. 1956)
 September 29 – Enrico Fermi, Italian physicist and Nobel Prize laureate, who created the world's first nuclear reactor (d. 1954)

Deaths
 January 27 – Giuseppe Verdi, Italian composer (b. 1813)
 April 8 – Giulio Bizzozero, Italian doctor and medical researcher (b. 1846)
 April 25 – Michele Coppino, Italian politician (b. 1822) 
 May 22 – Gaetano Bresci, anarchist who assassinated King Umberto I of Italy (b. 1869)
 August 11 – Francesco Crispi, Italian statesman (b. 1818)

References

 De Grand, Alexander J. (2001). The hunchback's tailor: Giovanni Giolitti and liberal Italy from the challenge of mass politics to the rise of fascism, 1882–1922, Wesport/London: Praeger,  online edition
 Sarti, Roland (2004). Italy: a reference guide from the Renaissance to the present, New York: Facts on File Inc., 
 Snowden, Frank M. (1995) Naples in the Time of Cholera, 1884–1911, Cambridge: Cambridge University Press, 

 
Italy
Years of the 20th century in Italy